Damias occidentalis is a moth of the family Erebidae first described by Rothschild and Jordan in 1901. It is found on Nias, Engano and Borneo. The habitat consists of lowland forests and dipterocarp forests.

References

Damias
Moths described in 1901